Milan Gaľa (21 January 1953 in Jarovnice – 1 June 2012 near Košice) was a Slovak politician and Member of the European Parliament (MEP) with the Slovenská demokraticka a krestanska unia, part of the European People's Party and sat on the European Parliament's Committee on Culture and Education.

He was a substitute for the Committee on Development and the Committee on the Environment, Public Health and Food Safety. He was also a member of the Delegation for relations with the Gulf States and Yemen.

Education
 1976: Šafárik University (Košice), Medical Faculty
 1980: Certificate of postgraduate study, grade one, in stomatology

Career
 since 1976: Stomatologist
 1994: Chairman of the Prešov district centre of KDH (Christian Democratic Movement)
 2001: Member of the central council of SDKÚ (Slovak Democratic and Christian Union)
 1990: Member of the board of Prešov District National Council
 1990: Deputy Lord Mayor of Lipany
 1990-2002: Member of Lipany Town Council
 2001: Member of Prešov Regional Assembly
 1992: Member of the Federal Assembly of the Czech and Slovak Federative Republic
 1994-1999: Member of the National Council of the Slovak Republic
 2002-2004: Member of the National Council of the Slovak Republic, Vice-Chairman of the Committee for Health Care

See also
 2004 European Parliament election in Slovakia

References

External links
 
 

1953 births
2012 deaths
Slovak Democratic and Christian Union – Democratic Party MEPs
MEPs for Slovakia 2004–2009
MEPs for Slovakia 2009–2014
Members of the National Council (Slovakia) 1994-1998
Members of the National Council (Slovakia) 2002-2006